The 2014 Cotton Bowl Classic was a college football bowl game between the #9 Missouri Tigers of the Southeastern Conference and the #13 Oklahoma State Cowboys of the Big 12 Conference. The 78th edition of the Cotton Bowl Classic took place on January 3, 2014 at 8:00 p.m. EST and aired on FOX.  It was one of the 2013–14 bowl games that concluded the 2013 FBS football season. AT&T Stadium, formerly known as Cowboys Stadium and located in Arlington, Texas, hosted the game for the sixth straight year.  The game was sponsored by telecommunications company AT&T, and was officially known as the AT&T Cotton Bowl Classic.

The Tigers beat the Cowboys by a score of 41–31 to claim the school's second-ever Cotton Bowl Classic championship and set a new AT&T Stadium record with 24 points in the fourth quarter. This was the final Cotton Bowl Classic in the BCS Era, as the College Football Playoff was introduced to start the next season.

Teams
This was Missouri's third appearance in the Cotton Bowl Classic (their first as a member of the SEC) and Oklahoma State's fourth appearance. Missouri and Oklahoma State were previously conference rivals in the Big 12. In addition, the two teams shared a conference from 1925 to 1928 (when the conference was called the Missouri Valley Intercollegiate Athletic Association and would become the Missouri Valley Conference after that year) and again from 1958 to 2012 (still under the MVIAA name until 1964, then under the name Big Eight Conference from 1964 to 1996).

Missouri

The Missouri Tigers were coached by Gary Pinkel. Missouri won the SEC Eastern Division but lost to Auburn in the 2013 SEC Championship Game 59–42. Auburn and Alabama took the conference's two BCS bids over Missouri.

Oklahoma State

The Oklahoma State Cowboys were coached by Mike Gundy. Oklahoma State led the Big 12 Conference going into the final week of the season, but lost to Oklahoma 33–24 on December 7. Baylor won later that day to clinch the conference's BCS bid.

Scoring summary

Statistics

Notes
 December 28, 2013 – Big 12 team and SEC team arrival
 January 3, 2014 – The game lasted four hours and 19 minutes, became the longest in Classic history

References

Cotton Bowl Classic
Cotton Bowl Classic
Cotton Bowl Classic
Missouri Tigers football bowl games
Oklahoma State Cowboys football bowl games
Cotton Bowl Classic